Gianfranco Martin (born 15 February 1970) is an Italian alpine skier who competed in the 1992 Winter Olympics and in the 1994 Winter Olympics.

Biography
He was born in Genoa. In 1992 he won the silver medal in the Alpine combined event. In the Super-G competition he finished twelfth and in the downhill contest he finished 14th. Two years later he finished 15th in the Alpine combined event and 29th in the giant slalom competition.

See also
 Italy national alpine ski team at the Olympics

References

External links
 

1970 births
Living people
Sportspeople from Genoa
Italian male alpine skiers
Olympic alpine skiers of Italy
Alpine skiers at the 1992 Winter Olympics
Alpine skiers at the 1994 Winter Olympics
Olympic silver medalists for Italy
Olympic medalists in alpine skiing
Medalists at the 1992 Winter Olympics
Italian alpine skiing coaches